The 2018 Baltimore Orioles season was the team's 118th season overall, 65th in Baltimore, and 27th at Oriole Park at Camden Yards. They attempted to rebound from their first losing season since 2011 when they went 75–87. However, the Orioles instead suffered one of the worst seasons in MLB history, en route to finishing 47–115. The Orioles set several statistical records and quirks, such as being 60 or more games behind the division (later World Series) champions Boston Red Sox, the most games behind a division champion since the 1935 Boston Braves, who themselves lost 115 games. With their 47–115 record, they became the first team since the 2003 Detroit Tigers, who also suffered a similar fate when they went 43–119, to have fewer than 50 wins in a full 162-game season. The Orioles held a losing record against all American League teams, ensured by their loss to the Houston Astros on September 28. First baseman Chris Davis posted a .168 batting average and a -2.7 WAR in his third year of a 7-year, $161 million contract, the worst of any player since Adam Dunn in 2011, who posted a -2.9 WAR and a .159 batting average.

To further add to the team's abysmal season, their top players such as Manny Machado, Zack Britton, Jonathan Schoop, Darren O'Day, Kevin Gausman, and Brad Brach were all traded in the trade deadline.

Manager Buck Showalter and general manager Dan Duquette's contracts expired and were not renewed concluding the season.

Regular season

Season standings

American League East

American League Wild Card

Record against opponents

Detailed records

Detailed records

Game log

|- bgcolor=#bfb
| 1 || March 29 || Twins || 3–2 (11) || Bleier (1–0) || Rodney (0–1) || — || 45,469 || 1–0 || W1
|- bgcolor=#fbb
| 2 || March 31 || Twins || 2–6 || Gibson (1–0) || Cashner (0–1) || — || 17,763 || 1–1 || L1
|- bgcolor=#fbb
| 3 || April 1 || Twins || 0–7 || Berríos (1–0) || Gausman (0–1) || — || 17,212 || 1–2 || L2
|- bgcolor=#fbb
| 4 || April 2 || @ Astros || 1–6 || Morton (1–0) || Tillman (0–1) || — || 42,675 || 1–3 || L3
|- bgcolor=#fbb
| 5 || April 3 || @ Astros || 6–10 || Rondón (1–0) || Araújo (0–1) || — ||40,081|| 1–4 || L4
|- bgcolor=#fbb
| 6 || April 4 || @ Astros || 2–3 || Peacock (1–0) || Castro (0–1) || — || 27,698 || 1–5 || L5
|- bgcolor=#bfb
| 7 || April 5 || @ Yankees || 5–2 || Cashner (1–1) || Tanaka (1–1) || Brach (1) ||33,653|| 2–5 || W1
|- bgcolor=#bfb
| 8 || April 6 || @ Yankees || 7–3 (14) || Araújo (1–1) || Holder (1–1) || — || 34,244 || 3–5 || W2
|- bgcolor=#fbb
| 9 || April 7 || @ Yankees || 3–8 || Gray (1–0) || Tillman (0–2) || — || 34,388 || 3–6 || L1
|- bgcolor=#bfb
| 10 || April 8 || @ Yankees || 8–7 (12) || Bleier (2–0) || Warren (0–1) || Brach (2) || 37,096 || 4–6 || W1
|- bgcolor=#fbb
| 11 || April 9 || Blue Jays || 1–7 || Happ (2–1) || Bundy (0–1) || — || 7,915 || 4–7 || L1
|- bgcolor=#fbb
| 12 || April 10 || Blue Jays || 1–2 || Sanchez (1–1) || O'Day (0–1) || Osuna (5) || 8,640 || 4–8 || L2
|- bgcolor=#bfb
| 13 || April 11 || Blue Jays || 5–3 || Gausman (1–1) || Estrada (1–1) || Brach (3) || 10,399 || 5–8 || W1
|- bgcolor=#fbb
| 14 || April 13 || @ Red Sox || 3–7 || Rodríguez (1–0) ||  Tillman (0–3) || — || 32,610 || 5–9 || L1
|- bgcolor=#fbb
| 15 || April 14 || @ Red Sox || 3–10 || Velázquez (2–0) || Cobb (0–1) || Walden (1) || 33,584 || 5–10 || L2
|- bgcolor=#fbb
| 16 || April 15 || @ Red Sox || 1–3 || Hembree (2–0) || Bundy (0–2) || Kimbrel (5) || 32,489 || 5–11 || L3
|- bgcolor=#bbb
| — || April 16 || @ Red Sox || colspan=7|Postponed (rain). Makeup date May 17.
|- bgcolor=#fbb
| 17 || April 17 || @ Tigers || 2–4 || Liriano (2–1) || Cashner (1–2) || Greene (3) || 15,530 || 5–12 || L4
|- bgcolor=#fbb
| 18 || April 18 || @ Tigers || 5–6 || Greene (1–0) || Araújo (1–2) || — || 15,178 || 5–13 || L5
|- bgcolor=#fbb
| 19 || April 19 || @ Tigers || 8–13 || Zimmermann (1–0) || Cobb (0–2) || — || 15,916 || 5–14 || L6
|- bgcolor=#bfb
| 20 || April 20 || Indians || 3–1 || Bundy (1–2) || Bauer (1–2) || O'Day (1) || 20,004 || 6–14 || W1
|- bgcolor=#fbb
| 21 || April 21 || Indians || 0–4 || Clevinger (2–0) || Tillman (0–4) || — || 29,187 || 6–15 || L1
|- bgcolor=#fbb
| 22 || April 22 || Indians || 3–7 || Kluber (3–1) || Cashner (1–3) || — || 27,394 || 6–16 || L2
|- bgcolor=#fbb
| 23 || April 23 || Indians || 1–2 || Carrasco (4–0) || Gausman (1–2) || Allen (4) || 10,614 || 6–17 || L3
|- bgcolor=#bbb
| — || April 24 || Rays || colspan=7| Postponed (rain). Makeup date May 12 as part of doubleheader.
|- bgcolor=#fbb
| 24 || April 25 || Rays || 4–8 || Kittredge (1–2) || Cobb (0–3) || — || 8,730 || 6–18 || L4
|- bgcolor=#fbb
| 25 || April 26 || Rays || 5–9 || Archer (2–1) || Bundy (1–3) || — || 9,586 || 6–19 || L5
|- bgcolor=#bfb
| 26 || April 27 || Tigers || 6–0 || Tillman (1–4) || Fiers (2–2) || — || 14,223 || 7–19 || W1
|- bgcolor=#fbb
| 27 || April 28 || Tigers || 5–9 || Liriano (3–1) || Cashner (1–4) || — || 20,896 || 7–20 || L1
|- bgcolor=#bfb
| 28 || April 29 || Tigers || 5–3 || Gausman (2–2) || Norris (0–2) || O'Day (2) || 28,089 || 8–20 || W1
|-

|- bgcolor=#fbb
| 29 || May 1 || @ Angels || 2–3 || Bedrosian (1–0) || Brach (0–1) || — || 32,345 || 8–21 || L1
|- bgcolor=#fbb
| 30 || May 2 || @ Angels || 7–10 || Heaney (1–1) || Bundy (1–4) || — || 32,156 || 8–22 || L2
|- bgcolor=#fbb
| 31 || May 3 || @ Angels || 3–12 || Barría (2–1) || Tillman (1–5) || — || 35,879 || 8–23 || L3
|- bgcolor=#fbb
| 32 || May 4 || @ Athletics || 4–6 || Trivino (2–0) || Brach (0–2) || Treinen (4) || 12,723 || 8–24 || L4
|- bgcolor=#fbb
| 33 || May 5 || @ Athletics || 0–2 (12) || Hatcher (3–0) || Araújo (1–3) || — || 24,612 || 8–25 || L5
|- bgcolor=#fbb
| 34 || May 6 || @ Athletics || 1–2 || Triggs (3–1) || Cobb (0–4) || Treinen (5) || 17,112 || 8–26 || L6
|- bgcolor=#fbb
| 35 || May 8 || Royals || 7–15 || Duffy (1–4) || Bundy (1–5) || — || 10,863 || 8–27 || L7
|- bgcolor=#bfb
| 36 || May 9 || Royals || 5–3 || Bleier (3–0) || McCarthy (3–1) || Brach (4) || 14,375 || 9–27 || W1
|- bgcolor=#bfb
| 37 || May 10 || Royals || 11–6 || Castro (1–1) || Kennedy (1–4) || — || 17,842 || 10–27 || W2
|- bgcolor=#bfb
| 38 || May 11 || Rays || 9–4 ||  Gausman (3–2) || Faria (3–2) || Brach (5) || 28,170 || 11–27 || W3
|- bgcolor=#bfb
| 39 || May 12 || Rays || 6–3 || Hess (1–0) || Archer (2–3) || Givens (1) || 24,534 || 12–27 || W4
|- bgcolor=#fbb
| 40 || May 12 || Rays || 3–10 || Romo (1–0) || Cobb (0–5) || — || 24,534 || 12–28 || L1
|- bgcolor=#bfb
| 41 || May 13 || Rays || 17–1 || Bundy (2–5) || Snell (4–3) || — || 25,257 || 13–28 || W1
|- bgcolor=#bbb
| — || May 15 || Phillies || colspan=7|Postponed (rain). Makeup date July 12.
|- bgcolor=#fbb
| 42 || May 16 || Phillies || 1–4 || Pivetta (3–2) || Cashner (1–5) || — || 29,706 || 13–29 || L1
|- bgcolor=#fbb
| 43 || May 17 || @ Red Sox || 2–6 || Price (4–4) || Gausman (3–3) || — || 36,615 || 13–30 || L2
|- bgcolor=#bfb
| 44 || May 18 || @ Red Sox || 7–4 || Cobb (1–5) || Pomeranz (1–2) || Brach (6) || 34,935 || 14–30 || W1
|- bgcolor=#fbb
| 45 || May 19 || @ Red Sox || 3–6 || Porcello (6–1) || Bundy (2–6) || Kimbrel (13) || 34,195 || 14–31 || L1
|- bgcolor=#fbb
| 46 || May 20 || @ Red Sox || 0–5 || Rodríguez (4–1) || Hess (1–1) || — || 35,550 || 14–32 || L2
|- bgcolor=#bfb
| 47 || May 21 || @ White Sox || 3–2 || Cashner (2–5) || Santiago (0–2) || Brach (7) || 11,628 || 15–32 || W1
|- bgcolor=#fbb
| 48 || May 22 || @ White Sox || 2–3 || Rondón (2–2) || Givens (0–1) || Jones (4) || 12,590 || 15–33 || L1
|- bgcolor=#fbb
| 49 || May 23 || @ White Sox || 1–11 || Covey (1–1) || Cobb (1–6) || — || 17,056 || 15–34 || L2
|- bgcolor=#bfb
| 50 || May 24 || @ White Sox || 9–3 || Bundy (3–6) || Giolito (3–5) || — || 19,147 || 16–34 || W1
|- bgcolor=#bfb
| 51 || May 25 || @ Rays || 2–0 || Hess (2–1) || Romo (1–1) || Brach (8) || 11,354 || 17–34 || W2
|- bgcolor=#fbb
| 52 || May 26 || @ Rays || 1–5 || Banda (1–0) || Cashner (2–6) || — || 14,744 || 17–35 || L1
|- bgcolor=#fbb
| 53 || May 27 || @ Rays || 3–8 || Nuño (1–0) || Gausman (3–4) || Pruitt (1) || 13,311 || 17–36 || L2
|- bgcolor=#fbb
| 54 || May 28 || Nationals || 0–6 || González (6–2) || Cobb (1–7) || — || 36,139 || 17–37 || L3
|- bgcolor=#fbb
| 55 || May 29 || Nationals || 2–3 || Hellickson (2–0) || Bundy (3–7) || Doolittle (12) || 13,935 || 17–38 || L4
|- bgcolor=#fbb
| 56 || May 30 || Nationals || 0–2 || Scherzer (9–1) || Hess (2–2) || Doolittle (13) || 20,370 || 17–39 || L5
|- bgcolor=#bbb
| — || May 31 || Yankees || colspan=7|Postponed (rain). Makeup date July 9 as part of doubleheader.
|-

|- bgcolor=#fbb
| 57 || June 1 || Yankees || 1–4 || Gray (4–4) || Cashner (2–6) || Chapman (13) || 26,500 || 17–40 || L6
|- bgcolor=#fbb
| 58 || June 2 || Yankees || 5–8 || Tanaka (7–2) || Gausman (3–5) ||  || 32,823 || 17–41 || L7
|- bgcolor=#bbb
| — || June 3 || Yankees || colspan=7|Postponed (rain). Makeup date August 25 as part of doubleheader.
|- bgcolor=#bfb
| 59 || June 5 || @ Mets || 2–1 || Cobb (2–7) || Vargas (2–4) || Brach (9) || 25,342 || 18–41 || W1
|- bgcolor=#bfb
| 60 || June 6 || @ Mets || 1–0 || Bundy (4–7) || Familia (2–3) || Brach (10) || 30,366 || 19–41 || W2
|- bgcolor=#fbb
| 61 || June 7 || @ Blue Jays || 4–5 (10) || Barnes (2–1) || Castro (1–2) || — || 24,494 || 19–42 || L1
|- bgcolor=#fbb
| 62 || June 8 || @ Blue Jays || 1–5 || Happ (8–3) || Cashner (2–8) || Tepera (3) || 28,863 || 19–43 || L2
|- bgcolor=#fbb
| 63 || June 9 || @ Blue Jays || 3–4 (10) || Axford (1–0) || Givens (0–2) || — || 34,643 || 19–44 || L3
|- bgcolor=#fbb
| 64 || June 10 || @ Blue Jays || 3–13 || Estrada (3–6) || Cobb (2–8) || — || 33,485 || 19–45 || L4
|- bgcolor=#fbb
| 65 || June 11 || Red Sox || 0–2 (12) || Hembree (3–1) || Givens (0–3) || Kimbrel (21) || 15,934 || 19–46 || L5
|- bgcolor=#fbb
| 66 || June 12 || Red Sox || 4–6 || Rodríguez (8–1) || Hess (2–3) || — || 21,837 || 19–47 || L6
|- bgcolor=#fbb
| 67 || June 13 || Red Sox || 1–5 || Sale (6–4) || Ramírez (0–1) || — || 17,217 || 19–48 || L7
|- bgcolor=#fbb
| 68 || June 15 || Marlins || 0–2 || Ureña (2–8) || Gausman (3–6) || Barraclough (5) || 23,968 || 19–49 || L8
|- bgcolor=#fbb
| 69 || June 16 || Marlins || 4–5 || Chen (2–8) || Cobb (2–9) || Steckenrider (1) || 23,948 || 19–50 || L9
|- bgcolor=#bfb
| 70 || June 17 || Marlins || 10–4 || Bundy (5–7) || Richards (1–4) || — || 21,421 || 20–50 || W1
|- bgcolor=#fbb
| 71 || June 19 || @ Nationals || 7–9 || Miller (5–0) || Scott (0–1) || Doolittle (19) || 33,391 || 20–51 || L1
|- bgcolor=#bfb
| 72 || June 20 || @ Nationals || 3–0 || Castro (2–2) || González (6–4) || — || 32,153 || 21–51 || W1
|- bgcolor=#fbb
| 73 || June 21 || @ Nationals || 2–4 || Herrera (2–1) || Givens (0–4) || Doolittle (20) || 36,868 || 21–52 || L1
|- bgcolor=#bfb
| 74 || June 22 || @ Braves || 10–7 (15) || Wright (1–0) || Moylan (0–1) || — || 37,192 || 22–52 || W1
|- bgcolor=#bfb
| 75 || June 23 || @ Braves || 7–5 || Bundy (6–7) || Teherán (5–5) || Britton (1) || 40,333 || 23–52 || W2
|- bgcolor=#fbb
| 76 || June 24 || @ Braves || 3–7 || McCarthy (6–3) || Hess (2–4) || — || 33,794 || 23–53 || L1
|- bgcolor=#fbb
| 77 || June 25 || Mariners || 3–5 || Hernández (7–6) || Castro (2–3) || Díaz (28) || 21,202 || 23–54 || L2
|- bgcolor=#fbb
| 78 || June 26 || Mariners || 2–3 || Paxton (7–2) || O'Day (0–2) || Díaz (29) || 16,327 || 23–55 || L3
|- bgcolor=#fbb
| 79 || June 27 || Mariners || 7–8 (11) || Bradford (5–0) || Givens (0–5) || Díaz (30) || 15,502 || 23–56 || L4
|- bgcolor=#fbb
| 80 || June 28 || Mariners || 2–4 (10) || Pazos (2–1) || Castro (2–4) || Nicasio (1) || 14,263 || 23–57 || L5
|- bgcolor=#fbb
| 81 || June 29 || Angels || 1–7 || Peña (1–0) || Hess (2–5) || — || 24,007 || 23–58 || L6
|- bgcolor=#fbb
| 82 || June 30 || Angels || 2–6 || Anderson (2–2) || Givens (0–6) || — || 38,838 || 23–59 || L7
|-

|- bgcolor=#bfb
| 83 || July 1 || Angels || 8–2 || Gausman (4–6) || McGuire (0–1) || — || 18,351 || 24–59 || W1
|- bgcolor=#fbb
| 84 || July 3 || @ Phillies || 2–3 || Eflin (7–2) || Cobb (2–10) || Domínguez (8) || 28,204 || 24–60 || L1
|- bgcolor=#fbb
| 85 || July 4 || @ Phillies || 1–4|| Nola (11–2) || Ramírez (0–2) || Arano (1) || 30,943 || 24–61 || L2
|- bgcolor=#fbb
| 86 || July 5 || @ Twins || 2–5 || Slegers (1–0) || Cashner (2–9) || Rodney (18) || 22,895 || 24–62 || L3
|- bgcolor=#fbb
| 87 || July 6 || @ Twins || 2–6 || Lynn (6–7) || Bundy (6–8) || — || 27,570 || 24–63 || L4
|- bgcolor=#fbb
| 88 || July 7 || @ Twins || 4–5 || Gibson (3–6) || Castro (2–5) || Rodney (19) || 25,974 || 24–64 || L5
|- bgcolor=#fbb
| 89 || July 8 || @ Twins || 1–10 || Odorizzi (4–6) || Cobb (2–11) || — || 22,557 || 24–65 || L6
|- bgcolor=#bfb
| 90 || July 9 || Yankees || 5–4 || Wright (2–0) || Sabathia (6–4) || Britton (2) || 26,340 || 25–65 || W1
|- bgcolor=#fbb
| 91 || July 9 || Yankees || 2–10 || Cessa (1–1) || Ramírez (0–3) || Gallegos (1) || 26,340 || 25–66 || L1
|- bgcolor=#bfb
| 92 || July 10 || Yankees || 6–5 || Britton (1–0) || Betances (1–3) || — || 18,418 || 26–66 || W1
|- bgcolor=#fbb
| 93 || July 11 || Yankees || 0–9 || Gray (6–7) || Bundy (6–9) || — || 17,808 || 26–67 || L1
|- bgcolor=#fbb
| 94 || July 12 || Phillies || 4–5 || Pivetta (6–7) || Gausman (4–7) || Domínguez (9) || 20,100 || 26–68 || L2
|- bgcolor=#fbb
| 95 || July 13 || Rangers || 4–5 || Hamels (5–8)  || Cobb (2–12)  || Kela (23) || 17,348 || 26–69 ||L3
|- bgcolor=#bfb
| 96 || July 14 || Rangers || 1–0 || Brach (1–2) || Pérez (2–4) || Britton (3) || 38,238 || 27–69 || W1
|- bgcolor=#bfb
| 97 || July 15 || Rangers || 6–5 || Scott (1–1) || Minor (6–6) || Britton (4) || 18,754  || 28–69 || W2
|- bgcolor=#bbcaff
| ASG || July 17 || @ Nationals Park || AL 8–6 (10) NL || Díaz || Stripling || Happ || 43,843 || — || Box
|- bgcolor=#fbb
| 98 || July 20 || @ Blue Jays || 7–8 (10) || Axford (3–1) || Fry (0–1) || — || 31,115 || 28–70 || L1
|- bgcolor=#fbb
| 99 || July 21 || @ Blue Jays || 1–4 || Stroman (3–7) || Cobb (2–13) || Tepera (7) || 35,912 || 28–71 || L2
|- bgcolor=#fbb
| 100 || July 22 || @ Blue Jays || 4–5 || Axford (4–1) || Scott (1–2) || Clippard (7) || 39,021 || 28–72 || L3
|- bgcolor=#fbb
| 101 || July 23 || Red Sox || 3–5 || Porcello (12–4) || Gausman (4–8) || Kimbrel (32) || 16,885 || 28–73 || L4
|- bgcolor=#bfb
| 102 || July 24 || Red Sox || 7–6 || Ramírez (1–3) || Porcello (1–4) || Brach (11) || 13,342 || 29–73 || W1
|- bgcolor=#bbb
| — || July 25 || Red Sox || colspan=7|Postponed (rain). Makeup date August 11 as part of doubleheader.
|- bgcolor=#fbb
| 103 || July 26 || Rays || 3–4 || Yarbrough (9–5) || Cobb (2–14) || Pruitt (2) || 19,025 || 29–74 || L1
|- bgcolor=#bfb
| 104 || July 27 || Rays || 15–5 || Cashner (3–9) || Archer (3–5) || — || 15,649 || 30–74 || W1
|- bgcolor=#bfb
| 105 || July 28 || Rays || 11–2 || Gausman (5–8) || Stanek (1–3) || — || 21,526 || 31–74 || W2
|- bgcolor=#bfb
| 106 || July 29 || Rays || 11–5 || Bundy (7–9) || Chirinos (0–3) || — || 22,454 || 32–74 || W3
|- bgcolor=#fbb
| 107 || July 31 || @ Yankees || 3–6 || Tanaka (9–2) || Ramírez (1–4) || — || 46,473 || 32–75 ||L1
|-

|- bgcolor=#bfb
| 108 || August 1 || @ Yankees || 7–5 || Cobb (3–14) || Gray (8–8) || — || 47,206 || 33–75 || W1
|- bgcolor=#fbb
| 109 || August 2 || @ Rangers || 8–17 || Gallardo (6–1) || Cashner (3–10) || Butler (1) || 19,367 || 33–76 || L1
|- bgcolor=#fbb
| 110 || August 3 || @ Rangers || 3–11 ||Jurado (2–1)  ||Hess (2–6) || — || 22,544 || 33–77 ||L2 
|- bgcolor=#fbb
| 111 || August 4 || @ Rangers || 1–3 ||Minor (8–6) ||Bundy (7–10) || Leclerc (1) || 24,300 || 33–78 || L3
|- bgcolor=#bfb
| 112 || August 5 || @ Rangers || 9–6 || Scott (2–2) || Hutchison (1–2) || Givens (2) || 19,961 || 34–78 || W1
|- bgcolor=#fbb
| 113 || August 7 || @ Rays || 3–4 || Romo (2–2) || Castro (2–6) || — || 11,734 || 34–79 ||L1
|- bgcolor=#bfb
| 114 || August 8 || @ Rays || 5–4 || Wright (3–0) || Romo (2–3) || Givens (3) || 9,474 || 35–79 || W1
|- bgcolor=#fbb
| 115 || August 9 || @ Rays || 4–5 || Chirinos (1–4) || Carroll (0–1) || Romo (14) || 10,254 || 35–80 || L1
|- bgcolor=#fbb
| 116 || August 10 || Red Sox || 12–19 || Pomeranz (2–5) || Castro (2–7) || — || 23,649 || 35–81 || L2
|- bgcolor=#fbb
| 117 || August 11 || Red Sox || 0–5 || Price (12–6) || Yacabonis (0–1) || — || 18,003 || 35–82 || L3
|- bgcolor=#fbb
| 118 || August 11 || Red Sox || 4–6 || Kelly (4–0) || Wright (3–1) || Kimbrel (34) || 24,051 || 35–83 || L4
|- bgcolor=#fbb
| 119 || August 12 || Red Sox || 1–4 || Sale (12–4) || Cobb (3–15) || Kimbrel (35) || 25,303 || 35–84 || L5
|- bgcolor=#bfb
| 120 || August 14 || Mets || 6–3 || Cashner (4–10) || Wahl (0–1) || Givens (4) || 20,527 || 36–84 || W1
|- bgcolor=#fbb
| 121 || August 15 || Mets || 5–16 || Wheeler (8–6) || Bundy (7–11) || — || 25,045 || 36–85 || L1
|- bgcolor=#fbb
| 122 || August 17 || @ Indians || 1–2 || Carrasco (15–6) || Hess (2–7) || Allen (24) || 28,264 || 36–86 || L2
|- bgcolor=#bfb
| 123 || August 18 || @ Indians || 4–2 || Cobb (4–15) || Plutko (4–3) || — || 35,007 || 37–86 || W1
|- bgcolor=#fbb
| 124 || August 19 || @ Indians || 0–8 || Clevinger (9–7) || Ramírez (1–5) || — || 30,555 || 37–87 || L1
|- style="text-align:center; background-color:#933; color:white"
| 125 || August 20 || @ Blue Jays || 3–5 || Estrada (7–9) || Cashner (4–11) || Giles (16) || 25,031 || 37–88 || L2
|- bgcolor=#fbb
| 126 || August 21 || @ Blue Jays || 2–8 || Gaviglio (3–6) || Bundy (7–12) || — || 25,855 || 37–89 || L3
|- bgcolor=#fbb
| 127 || August 22 || @ Blue Jays || 0–6 || Pannone (1–0) || Hess (2–8) || — || 40,595 || 37–90 || L4
|- bgcolor=#fbb
| 128 || August 24 || Yankees || 5–7 (10) || Green (7–2) || Carroll (0–2) || Britton (5) || 27,150 || 37–91 || L5
|- bgcolor=#fbb
| 129 || August 25 || Yankees || 3–10 || Happ (15–6) || Yacabonis (0–2) || Cessa (1) || 32,445 || 37–92 || L6
|- bgcolor=#fbb
| 130 || August 25 || Yankees || 1–5 || Gray (10–8) || Cashner (4–12) || Betances (1) || 26,236 || 37–93 || L7
|- bgcolor=#fbb
| 131 || August 26 || Yankees || 3–5 || Severino (17–6) || Bundy (7–13) || Robertson (4) || 17,343 || 37–94 || L8
|- bgcolor=#bfb
| 132 || August 27 || Blue Jays || 7–0 || Hess (3–8) || Gaviglio (3–7) || — || 15,436 || 38–94 ||W1
|- bgcolor=#bfb
| 133 || August 28 || Blue Jays || 12–5 || Rogers (1–0) || Pannone (1–1) || — || 11,762 || 39–94 ||W2
|- bgcolor=#bfb
| 134 || August 29 || Blue Jays || 10–5 || Gilmartin (1–0) || Barnes (2–2) || Givens (5) || 11,834 || 40–94 || W3
|- bgcolor=#fbb
| 135 || August 31 || @ Royals || 2–9 || Keller (7–5) || Cashner (4–13) || — || 15,394 || 40–95 || L1
|-

|- bgcolor=#fbb
| 136 || September 1 || @ Royals || 4–5 || Newberry (1–0) || Givens (0–7) || — || 15,358 || 40–96 || L2
|- bgcolor=#fbb
| 137 || September 2 || @ Royals || 1–9 || López (1–3) || Hess (3–9) || — || 18,463 || 40–97 || L3
|- bgcolor=#fbb
| 138 || September 3 || @ Mariners || 1–2 || Ramírez (2–3) || Rogers (1–1) || Díaz (52) || 20,579 || 40–98 || L4 
|- bgcolor=#bfb
| 139 || September 4 || @ Mariners || 5–3 || Cobb (5–15) || Warren (2–2) || Givens (6) || 11,265 || 41–98 || W1 
|- bgcolor=#fbb
| 140 || September 5 || @ Mariners || 2–5 || Leake (9–9) || Cashner (4–14) || Díaz (53) || 15,017 || 41–99 || L1 
|- bgcolor=#fbb
| 141 || September 7 || @ Rays || 2–14 || Snell (18–5) || Bundy (7–14) || — || 12,436 || 41–100 || L2
|- bgcolor=#fbb
| 142 || September 8 || @ Rays || 5–10 || Yarbrough (14–5) || Hess (3–10) || — || 10,275 || 41–101 || L3
|- bgcolor=#fbb
| 143 || September 9 || @ Rays || 3–8 || Chirinos (4–5) || Rogers (1–2) || — || 13,632 || 41–102 || L4
|- bgcolor=#fbb
| 144 || September 11 || Athletics || 2–3 || Fiers (12–6) || Wright (3–2) || Familia (18) || 9,141 || 41–103 || L5
|- bgcolor=#fbb
| 145 || September 12 || Athletics || 0–10 || Mengden (7–6) || Cashner (4–15) || — || 10,480 || 41–104 || L6
|- bgcolor=#bfb
| 146 || September 13 || Athletics || 5–3 || Bundy (8–14) || Anderson (3–5) || Givens (7) || 11,714 || 42–104 || W1
|- bgcolor=#fbb
| 147 || September 14 || White Sox || 6–8 || Shields (7–16) || Ortiz (0–1) || Jones (5) || 18,265 || 42–105 || L1
|- bgcolor=#fbb
| 148 || September 15 || White Sox || 0–2 || López (6–9) || Ramirez (1–6) || Minaya (1) || 23,266 || 42–106 || L2
|- bgcolor=#bfb
| 149 || September 16 || White Sox || 8–4 || Meisinger (1–0) || Giolito (10–11) || Fry (1) || 19,104 || 43–106 || W1
|- bgcolor=#fbb
| 150 || September 17 || Blue Jays || 0–5 || Borucki (4–4) || Phillips (0–1) || — || 8,198 || 43–107 || L1
|- bgcolor=#fbb
| 151 || September 18 || Blue Jays || 4–6 || Petricka (3–1) || Bundy (8–15) || Giles (23) || 9,096 || 43–108 || L2
|- bgcolor=#bfb
| 152 || September 19 || Blue Jays || 2–1 || Wright (4–2) || Estrada (7–13) || Givens (8) || 11,337 || 44–108 || W1
|- bgcolor=#fbb
| 153 || September 21 || @ Yankees || 8–10 || CC Sabathia (8–7) || Ramírez (1–7) || Betances (4) || 39,903 || 44–109 || L1
|- bgcolor=#fbb
| 154 || September 22 || @ Yankees || 2–3 (11) || Kahnle (2–0) || Fry (0–2) || — || 40,185 || 44–110 || L2
|- bgcolor=#bfb
| 155 || September 23 || @ Yankees || 6–3 || Meisinger (2–0) || Cole (4–2) || Givens (9) || 43,606 || 45–110 || W1
|- bgcolor=#fbb
| 156 || September 24 || @ Red Sox || 2–6 || Eovaldi (6–7) || Bundy (8–16) || — || 35,619 || 45–111 || L1
|- bgcolor=#bbb
| – || September 25 || @ Red Sox || colspan=7|Postponed (rain). Makeup date September 26 as part of a doubleheader.
|- bgcolor=#fbb
| 157 || September 26 || @ Red Sox || 3–19 || Price (16–7) || Meisinger (2–1) || — || 33,577 || 45–112 || L2
|- bgcolor=#bfb
| 158 || September 26 || @ Red Sox || 10–3 || Scott (3–2) || Barnes (6–4) || Fry (2) || 34,445 || 46–112 || W1
|- bgcolor=#bbb
| — || September 27 || Astros || colspan=7|Postponed (rain). Makeup date September 29 as part of a doubleheader.
|- bgcolor=#fbb
| 159 || September 28 || Astros || 1–2 || Sipp (3–1) || Scott (3–3) || Osuna (21) || 18,434 || 46–113 || L1
|- bgcolor=#fbb
| 160 || September 29 || Astros || 3–4 || Harris (5–3) || Gilmartin (1–1) || Rondón (15) || N/A || 46–114 || L2
|- bgcolor=#fbb
| 161 || September 29 || Astros || 2–5 || Peacock (3–4) || Ramírez (1–8) || Pressly (2) || 26,020 || 46–115 || L3
|- bgcolor=#bfb
| 162 || September 30 || Astros || 4–0 || Fry''' (1–2) || Peacock (3–5) || — || 24,916 || 47–115 ||W1
|-

Roster

Farm system

References

External links
Baltimore Orioles 2018 Schedule at MLB.com
2018 Baltimore Orioles season at Baseball Reference

Baltimore Orioles seasons
Baltimore Orioles
2018 in sports in Maryland